Mame Fatou Faye (born 19 August 1986) is a Senegalese athlete specialising in the 400 metres hurdles. Apart from hurdling, she runs in the 4 x 400 metres relay where she won several international medals.

Her personal best in her main event is 56.37 seconds set in Dakar in 2012.

Competition record

References

1986 births
Living people
Senegalese female hurdlers
Senegalese female sprinters
Universiade medalists in athletics (track and field)
Universiade medalists for Senegal
Competitors at the 2007 Summer Universiade
Competitors at the 2011 Summer Universiade
Competitors at the 2013 Summer Universiade
Medalists at the 2009 Summer Universiade
Athletes (track and field) at the 2007 All-Africa Games
Athletes (track and field) at the 2011 All-Africa Games
African Games competitors for Senegal